Hereniko is a surname. Notable people with the surname include:

Jeannette Paulson Hereniko, American film producer, television writer, and film festival founder
Vilsoni Hereniko (born 1954), Fijian playwright, film director, and academic